Yadira D. Caraveo (born December 23, 1980) is an American politician and pediatrician serving as the U.S. representative for Colorado's 8th congressional district since 2023. A Democrat, she is Colorado's first Latina member of Congress.

Caraveo represented the 31st district in the Colorado House of Representatives from 2019 to 2023. The district covered parts of Adams and Weld counties.

Early life and education
Caraveo was born in Colorado to Mexican undocumented parents who arrived in the 1970s but were granted amnesty under the Immigration Reform and Control Act of 1986. She volunteered for Barack Obama's 2008 presidential campaign while in medical school. She received her bachelor's degree from Regis University and later her Doctor of Medicine degree from the University of Colorado School of Medicine. Caraveo completed a residency in pediatrics at the University of New Mexico Health Sciences Center, where she was also involved with the Committee of Interns and Residents union for resident physicians.

Colorado House of Representatives
Along with being a state legislator for part of the year, Caraveo is also a pediatrician practicing in Thornton, Colorado. She has also served on the board of trustees for the Anythink Library system in Adams County since 2017.

Election
Caraveo was elected in the general election on November 6, 2018, winning 55% of the vote to Republican nominee Rico Figueroa's 39%.

Tenure
Caraveo sponsored a bill giving free contraceptives and reproductive care to illegal immigrants citing studies showing the program lowers maternal mortality and infant mortality rates. She sponsored a bill that would put an age requirement on some cannabis products, require coroners to conduct a THC test for all "unnatural deaths", and put a cap on potency levels in products. The bill was controversial, Caraveo argued it would stop younger people from getting addicted to cannabis and opponents argued testing would be racially motivated. The bill was co-sponsored by Republican members of the legislature and disavowed by Democratic House Speaker Alec Garnett. She also sponsored or helped craft other bills aimed at improving healthcare, supporting medical workers, early education, and lowering prescription drug costs, among other measures.

Committees
During the 73rd general assembly, Caraveo served on the following committees:
Health & Insurance (Vice Chair)
Education

U.S. House of Representatives

Elections

2022 

On August 24, 2021, Caraveo announced her candidacy for Colorado's 8th congressional district. She was endorsed by former Colorado Speaker of the House KC Becker, State Senator Faith Winter, State Senator Jessie Danielson, and others. On April 5, 2022, Caraveo secured the Democratic nomination.  On November 9, 2022, Caraveo defeated Republican nominee Barbara Kirkmeyer in the general election, becoming Colorado's first Latina member of Congress.

Caucus memberships 

 New Democrat Coalition

Committee assignments 

 Committee on Science and Technology
 Committee on Agriculture

Electoral history

See also

List of Hispanic and Latino Americans in the United States Congress

References

External links

Yadira Caraveo for Congress campaign website 
Representative Yadira Caraveo official legislative website
 

|-

|-

1980 births
21st-century American politicians
21st-century American physicians
21st-century American women physicians
21st-century American women politicians
American pediatricians
American politicians of Mexican descent
Democratic Party members of the Colorado House of Representatives
Democratic Party members of the United States House of Representatives from Colorado
Female members of the United States House of Representatives
Hispanic and Latino American members of the United States Congress
Hispanic and Latino American state legislators in Colorado
Hispanic and Latino American women in politics
Hispanic and Latino American women physicians
Living people
People from Thornton, Colorado
Regis University alumni
University of Colorado School of Medicine alumni
Women pediatricians
Women state legislators in Colorado